Myles Howard White (born March 30, 1990) is an American football wide receivers coach for the Miami University RedHawks of the MAC (NCAA FBS). He played college football at Louisiana Tech. White was signed by the Green Bay Packers as an undrafted free agent in 2013. He has also been a member of the New York Giants, New York Jets, and Winnipeg Blue Bombers.

Professional career

Green Bay Packers
On September 7, 2015, White was released by the Packers to make room for the signing of wide receiver James Jones.

New York Giants
On September 9, 2015, White was signed by the New York Giants and was placed on the practice squad. On October 7, 2015, he was promoted to the Giants' active roster. On August 30, 2016, he was waived by the Giants.

New York Jets
The New York Jets signed White to their practice squad on September 4, 2016. On September 12, 2016, he was released from the Jets' practice squad. He was re-signed to the practice squad on September 29, 2016. He was released by the Jets on October 26, 2016. He was re-signed to the practice squad on November 1, 2016 but was released on November 8.

Tampa Bay Buccaneers
On November 22, 2016 White was signed to the Buccaneers' practice squad.

New York Jets (second stint)
On January 11, 2017, White signed a reserve/future contract with the Jets. He was waived on September 1, 2017.

Winnipeg Blue Bombers
White was signed to the practice roster of the Winnipeg Blue Bombers on October 10th, 2017. After spending the 2018 preseason with Winnipeg, White was released.

Toronto Argonauts
On June 30th, 2018, White joined the practice roster of the Toronto Argonauts, where his twin brother cornerback Mitchell White played the previous season. The brothers did not have the chance to play during the 2018 season; Mitchell was lost early in the season with injury, while Myles was not promoted to the active roster until week 12. Myles played in 7 games, catching 14 passes for 109 yards and one touchdown.

Statistics
Source: NFL.com

References

External links
 Green Bay Packers bio
 Louisiana Tech Bulldogs bio
 Michigan State Spartans bio

1990 births
Living people
Players of American football from Tacoma, Washington
American football wide receivers
Michigan State Spartans football players
Northwest Mississippi Rangers football players
Louisiana Tech Bulldogs football players
Green Bay Packers players
New York Giants players
New York Jets players
Tampa Bay Buccaneers players
Toronto Argonauts players